The UEFA European Under-18 Championship 1960 Final Tournament was held in Austria.

Teams
The following teams entered the tournament:

  (host)

Group stage

Group A

Group B

Group C

Group D

Semifinals

Third place match

Final

External links
Results by RSSSF

UEFA European Under-19 Championship
1959–60 in Austrian football
Under-18
1960
1960s in Vienna
Sports competitions in Vienna
April 1960 sports events in Europe
1960 in youth association football